After Midnight is the eleventh studio album by American vocal group, The Manhattans, released in 1980 through Columbia Records.

Reception
The album peaked at No. 4 on the R&B albums chart. It also reached No. 24 on the Billboard 200. The album features the singles "Shining Star", which peaked at No. 4 on the Hot Soul Singles chart and No. 5 on the Billboard Hot 100, and "Girl of My Dream", which reached No. 30 on the Hot Soul Singles chart. This album has been Certified Gold by the R.I.A.A.

Track listing

Charts

Weekly charts

Year-end charts

Singles

References

External links
 

1980 albums
The Manhattans albums
Albums produced by Norman Harris
Albums produced by Leo Graham (songwriter)
Albums recorded at Sigma Sound Studios
Columbia Records albums